Ouch! is the fourth studio album by Lake, released in August 1980 in Europe and June 1981 in the USA.  It is the first album to be released following the departure of three members of the band from their peak period, Detlef Petersen, Geoffrey Peacey, and Martin Tiefense, who were replaced by Frank Hieber, Achim Opperman, and Heiko Efferz.

Track listing

Side One
 "Celebrate" (James Hopkins-Harrison, Achim Opperman) – 3:51
 "Come on Home" (J. Hopkins-Harrison, Frank Hieber) – 4:39
 "Listen to Me" (J. Hopkins-Harrison, F. Hieber, Heiko Efferz) – 4:16
 "Amigo" (J. Hopkins-Harrison, A. Opperman) – 2:50
 "Jamaica High" (J. Hopkins-Harrison, Alex Conti, F. Hieber) – 4:47

Side Two
 "Living for Today" (J. Hopkins-Harrison, A. Opperman) – 4:31
 "Something Here" (J. Hopkins-Harrison, F. Hieber) – 4:33
 "Hit Your Mama" (J. Hopkins-Harrison, F. Hieber) – 4:19
 "Southern Nights" (J. Hopkins-Harrison, F. Hieber) – 4:29

Personnel
James Hopkins-Harrison – lead and backup vocals
Alex Conti – guitar and vocals
Frank Hieber – keyboards and vocals
Achim Opperman – guitars and vocals
Heiko Efferz – bass guitar
Dieter Ahrendt – drums and percussion

Produced by James William Guercio
Recorded at Pye Studios, London, and Caribou Ranch, Colorado
Cover illustration by James McMullan
Design by Paula Scher

USA LP: Caribou Records JZ 37083
CD: Renaissance RMED0127

1980 albums
Caribou Records albums